The women's rhythmic individual all-around competition at the 2012 Summer Olympics was held at the Wembley Arena from 9–11 August.

Competition format
The competition consisted of a qualification round and a final round. The top ten gymnasts in the qualification round advanced to the final. In each round, the gymnasts performed four routines (ball, hoop, clubs, and ribbon), with the scores added to give a total.

Six gymnasts returned from the 2008 Olympics, and five of them made it to the final. Among them was Evgeniya Kanaeva of Russia, who became the first gymnast to successfully defend her Olympic title in the event.

Qualification results

Final results

References

Gymnastics at the 2012 Summer Olympics
2012
2012 in women's gymnastics
Women's events at the 2012 Summer Olympics